Joseph Wilson Ervin (March 3, 1901 – December 25, 1945) was a member of the United States House of Representatives from North Carolina.

Family background, education and early professional life 
He was the younger brother of a more famous politician, Sam Ervin.

Ervin was born in Morganton, Burke County, North Carolina. He attended the public schools, was graduated from the University of North Carolina at Chapel Hill in 1921 where he was a member of the Dialectic Society and from its law school in 1923, was admitted to the bar in 1923 and commenced practice in Charlotte, North Carolina.

U.S. Congressman 
He was elected as a Democrat to the Seventy-ninth Congress and served from January 3, 1945, until his death in Washington, D.C. on December 25, 1945, nearly a year after entering Congress.

Suicide 
He committed suicide by inhaling gas from a kitchen stove. This was said to be due to the pain from osteomyelitis from which he was suffering. His brother Sam Ervin was elected to finish his term. Joseph Ervin was interred in Forest Hill Cemetery, Morganton, N.C.

See also 
 List of United States Congress members who died in office (1900–49)

References

External links

 http://blogs.lib.unc.edu/ncm/index.php/2013/07/25/dec-19-ervin

1901 births
1945 suicides
North Carolina lawyers
University of North Carolina School of Law alumni
American politicians who committed suicide
Suicides in Washington, D.C.
People from Morganton, North Carolina
Suicides by gas
Democratic Party members of the United States House of Representatives from North Carolina
20th-century American lawyers
20th-century American politicians